Music on the Run (Italian: Fuga a due voci) is a 1943 Italian "white-telephones" musical comedy film directed by Carlo Ludovico Bragaglia and starring Gino Bechi, Irasema Dilián and Guglielmo Barnabò.

The film's sets were designed by the art directors Alfredo Montori and Mario Rappini. It was shot at Cinecittà Studios.

Cast
 Gino Bechi as The baritone Giulio Moris
 Irasema Dilián as Maria Santelli
 Guglielmo Barnabò as The industrialist Santelli, his father
 Aroldo Tieri as Piero, Maria's beau
 Paolo Stoppa as Fogliatti, the producer
 Carlo Campanini as Count Matteo
 Gildo Bocci as The vagabond
 Gero Zambuto as Berelli, the director
 Tina Mannozzi as Rina, the actress
 Armando Migliari as The commissioner
 Vasco Creti as The conductor on the train
 Franco Cuppini
 Paolo Ferrara as The director of the "Buona Fortuna" inn
 Pina Gallini as The Lady with the White Dog
 Enrico Luzi as The first screenwriter
 Polidor as The stationmaster
 Peppino Spadaro as The waiter of the inn
 Franco Volpi as The second screenwriter

References

Bibliography
 Burke, Frank . A Companion to Italian Cinema. John Wiley & Sons, 2017.

External links

1943 films
1940s Italian-language films
1943 musical comedy films
Italian musical comedy films
Italian black-and-white films
Films directed by Carlo Ludovico Bragaglia
Films shot at Cinecittà Studios
1940s Italian films